"Undo" is a song by Swedish singer Sanna Nielsen. The track was written and composed by Fredrik Kempe, David Kreuger, Hamed "K-One" Pirouzpanah. It premiered on 8 February 2014, as part of the second semi-final in Melodifestivalen 2014. The song successfully progressed to the final. The single was officially released on 23 February 2014, part of the EP of the same title. Undo is an uptempo ballad.

On 8 March, the song won the Melodifestivalen 2014 final beating Ace Wilder's "Busy Doin' Nothin'" by only two points and represented Sweden in the Eurovision Song Contest 2014 in the first semifinal on 6 May.

In the final, on 10 May 2014, after the results came through, "Undo" finished the contest in 3rd place with 218 points. With this score, "Undo" became the second highest scoring Swedish entry at Eurovision after Euphoria.

"Undo" won the OGAE vote with 354 winning the voting after all countries had voted.

"Undo" was sung by Lucia Wu, a Chinese singer from Brazil on Season 1 of Sing! China in 2016. This led to the song charting on streaming platforms in China in October 2016.

A high-energy pop-funk-fusion cover of this song was arranged by the Swedish trio Dirty Loops and performed at the 2015 Swedish Melody Festival, in keeping with the Festival tradition of an artist performing a cover of the last year's Festival.

Critical reception 
The song's reviews were mostly positive and was often described as the selection's favorite. Olivier Rocher of Oikotimes described it as "the hot favorite of the night". He also said that "Undo" is less memorable compared to her previous Melodifestivalen entries. Billy Xifaras of Wiwibloggs said that Nielsen is perhaps one of the strongest artists in the second semi-final. He also compared the song with "Wrecking Ball" by saying that "in the beginning it is similar to Miley Cyrus' hit".

With 10 reviews from the Wiwibloggs, "Undo" received an average of 8.2 out of 10, the second highest score at the final of Melodifestivalen, with Helena Paparizou's "Survivor" being first with an average of 8.48 out of 10.

Melodifestivalen 
Being Nielsen's seventh participation in the selection, "Undo" participated in the second semi-final of the 2014 Melodifestivalen which was held in Linköping's Cloetta Center on 8 February 2014. The previews of the second semi-final songs, including "Undo", were published on 6 February 2014.

The song was performed sixth at the second semi-final. It direct qualified to the final as it got one of the first two places. Right after the second chance, the running order of the final was revealed with "Undo" being performed at the eighth place. "Undo" won the selection just with two points ahead Ace Wilder; it received 90 points from the international jury and 122 points from the public.

Track listing

Charts

Weekly charts

Year-end charts

Certifications

References

2014 songs
Eurovision songs of 2014
Eurovision songs of Sweden
Melodifestivalen songs of 2014
2014 singles
Parlophone singles
2010s ballads
Pop ballads
Sanna Nielsen songs
Songs written by Fredrik Kempe
Songs written by David Kreuger
Songs about loneliness
English-language Swedish songs
Articles containing video clips